Herman John Nabors (November 19, 1887 in Montevallo, Alabama – October 29, 1923 in Wilton, Alabama), was a professional baseball pitcher in the Major Leagues from -. He played for the Philadelphia Athletics. From April 28 to September 28, 1916, Nabors lost 19 consecutive decisions, a major league record that has never been matched in a single season (though Cliff Curtis, several years previously, lost 23 straight decisions over 2 years, and Anthony Young once lost 27 straight decisions over the course of two seasons).

External links

1887 births
1923 deaths
Major League Baseball pitchers
Baseball players from Alabama
Philadelphia Athletics players
Talladega Tigers players
Newnan Cowetas players
Denver Bears players
Indianapolis Indians players
Sioux City Indians players